Mobile Mini, Inc. is an American portable storage company founded in 1983 and based in Phoenix, Arizona.

The company manufactures, leases, sells and transports welded steel mobile storage containers, which are converted into storage units, guard shacks, and offices. The lengths of the units are 5 to 45 feet long and can be customized with up to 100 different configuration options. Mobile Mini's lease fleet totals approximately 235,000 portable storage and office units.

The company has 177 locations throughout the United States, Canada and the United Kingdom. The company had a market capitalization of about US$1.363 billion as of July 2019, with revenues of about $593 million in 2018.

History
Mobile Mini, or Mobile Mini Storage Systems as it was first called, was founded in 1983 by Richard Bunger and started by selling storage containers to construction companies and manufacturers.

By 1986, the company expanded into markets outside Phoenix but in the Southwest region. Due to a shortage of cargo storage containers available, Mobile Mini started manufacturing containers in Phoenix. The early 1990s also saw the development of Mobile Mini's patented “bi-cam locking system.” As manufacturing facilities grew to accommodate new product lines and innovations, larger facilities were created, and Mobile Mini started building modular classrooms for the Arizona and New Mexico markets. In addition to these innovations and changes, Mobile Mini experienced huge growth in Texas, including Dallas, Houston, and San Antonio, along with completing acquisitions in 1998, in Las Vegas and Oklahoma City.

In the 2000s, Mobile Mini continued to experience phenomenal growth. The next evolution locking system, the patented "Tri-Cam Locking System", provided customers with security in the moving and storage industry. International expansion occurred in 2004 with the acquisition of Royal Wolf in the UK and the subsequent launch of the Mobile Mini UK website, www.mobilemini.co.uk.  In 2008, the company experienced a transformational merger with The Mobile Storage Group, giving Mobile Mini a combined portable storage and office rental fleet of more than 274,000 units.

In 2013, Mobile Mini appointed Erik Olsson as CEO.

In November 2014, Mobile Mini expanded its product line by purchasing Evergreen Tank Solutions for $405 million in cash. ETS was a leader in liquid and specialty containment solutions. With a fleet of tanks, trucks, pumps, and filters, Evergreen was a solid acquisition with a similar business model.

In Spring 2015, Mobile Mini announced the decision to divest 9,400 wood mobile offices in a sale to Acton Mobile.  The divestiture allowed Mobile Mini to focus on the core storage and containment products.

February 2017, Mobile Mini announced the uniting of all divisions under the Mobile Mini brand. The storage and ground level office piece was re-branded Mobile Mini Storage Solutions, while the specialty containment pieces made up of Evergreen Tank and Water Movers is called Mobile Mini Tank + Pump Solutions. The overarching brand became Mobile Mini Solutions. This change allows the 30+ years of goodwill earned by Mobile Mini to be utilized in the geographic growth of the tanks and pump product line.

Also in 2017 came Mobile Mini Connect, an on-demand customer service portal. The service offers customers real time account information and the ability to manage invoices, forms and rentals, in addition to requesting pickups of units.

In March 2020, Mobile Mini entered a merger agreement with Baltimore-based modular space rental company WillScot Corporation. The estimated value of the combined company is approximately $6.6 billion.

Products

Storage Containers

Ground Level, Security Offices

Records Storage Units

Steel / Stainless Tanks

Roll-Off / Vacuum Boxes

Filtration Units

Pumps

References

External links

Companies formerly listed on the Nasdaq
American companies established in 1983
Manufacturing companies established in 1983
Manufacturing companies based in Phoenix, Arizona
2020 mergers and acquisitions
Storage companies